The 2013–14 Zenit Saint Petersburg season was the 18th successive season that the club played in the Russian Premier League, the highest tier of football in Russia. They finished as runners-up to CSKA Moscow in the Russian Premier League, lost the 2013 Super Cup 3 – 0 to CSKA Moscow, were knocked out of the Russian Cup by Russian Professional Football League side FC Tyumen, and reached the Last 16 of the UEFA Champions League, losing to Borussia Dortmund.

Zenit started the season under the management of Luciano Spalletti, but Spalletti was sacked on 11 March 2014, being replaced by Sergei Semak, in a caretaker capacity, for nine days before André Villas-Boas was appointed manager on 20 March 2014.

Squad

On Loan

Youth Team squad

Transfers

Summer

In:

Out:

Winter

In:

Out:

Competitions

Russian Super Cup

Russian Premier League

Results by round

Matches

League table

Russian Cup

UEFA Champions League

Third qualifying round

Play-off round

Group stage

Knockout phase

Round of 16

Squad statistics

Appearances and goals

|-
|colspan="14"|Players away from the club on loan:

|-
|colspan="14"|Players who appeared for Zenit St. Petersburg no longer at the club:

|}

Top Scorers

Disciplinary record

Notes
Match was interrupted in the 86th minute with Dynamo leading 4-2 when Zenit fans ran out of the stands. At first they stood behind the goal line, when the referee decided to take the teams off the field into the dressing rooms and teams began to leave, one of Zenit fans punched Dynamo player Vladimir Granat, the match was then abandoned.
Austria Wien played their home matches at Ernst-Happel-Stadion, Vienna instead of their regular stadium, Franz Horr Stadium, Vienna.

References

FC Zenit Saint Petersburg seasons
Zenit Saint Petersburg
Zenit Saint Petersburg